The PFL 8 mixed martial arts event for the 2022 season of the Professional Fighters League was held on August 13, 2022, at the Cardiff Motorpoint Arena in Cardiff, Wales. This was the start of the playoffs for the Heavyweight and Welterweight divisions.

Background 
This will mark the second PFL playoff card, along with being the first PFL event held outside of America. The event will mark the start of the Heavyweight and Welterweight playoffs, with UFC veteran and former Bellator champion Rory MacDonald scheduled to take on undefeated Magomed Umalatov. On the other side of the bracket, Sadibou Sy takes on Carlos Leal. The Heavyweight bracket was to see Denis Goltsov taking on 2021 PFL Champion Bruno Cappelozza, while Ante Delija faced Renan Ferreira. However after picking up an injury, Cappelozza was unable to continue in the tournament and replaced by Matheus Scheffel. After visa issues forced Umalatov and Goltsov to pull out of their respective bouts due to visa issues, they were replaced bu Dilano Taylor and Juan Adams respectively.

Results

2022 PFL Heavyweight playoffs

Bruno Cappelozza was originally scheduled to face Denis Goltsov but was unable to continue in the tournament. He was replaced by #7 ranked Matheus Scheffel.
Denis Goltsov was originally scheduled to face Matheus Scheffel but was unable to continue in the tournament. He was replaced by #6 ranked Juan Adams.

2022 PFL Welterweight playoffs

Magomed Umalatov was originally scheduled to face Rory MacDonald but was unable to continue in the tournament. He was replaced by #7 ranked Dilano Taylor.

See also 

 List of PFL events
 List of current PFL fighters

References 

Events in Cardiff
Professional Fighters League
2022 in mixed martial arts
August 2022 sports events in the United Kingdom